Piletocera cumulalis is a moth in the family Crambidae. It was described by George Hampson in 1907. It is found on Borneo.

References

cumulalis
Endemic fauna of Borneo
Moths of Borneo
Moths described in 1907
Taxa named by George Hampson